Salmon High School is a public high school located in Salmon, Idaho.  Salmon High School is a part of the Salmon School District #291.

Extracurricular activities 
Extracurricular activities offered by the school include FFA, Travel Club, Natural Helpers, National Honor Society, Robotics, student council, pep band, and Key club.  Sports include football, volleyball, cross country, cheerleading, basketball, wrestling, golf, and track and field.  Other activities, such as hockey, rodeo, and baseball, are offered through the community.

Graduation requirements 
In order to receive a diploma from Salmon High School, students must maintain a "C" average (a 2.0 GPA) in core subjects.  The number of credits required varies between graduation years, currently ranging from 46 to 50.  In addition, students who entered 9th grade on or after the Fall of 2009 must take either the ACT, SAT, or COMPASS college placement test.  The same group of students must complete a senior project.

Mascot lawsuit 
In 1999, the Salmon School Board was threatened by the National Coalition on Racism in Sports and the Media with a $100,000 lawsuit if they did not change the schools mascot, the Savages.  Members of the coalition stated that Native American mascots were derogatory especially since the name was Savages.  After discussions with the board, the group decided to focus only on changing the mascot.   The school board ultimately chose to get rid of the logo featuring a Native American because it would cost more than $100,000 to fight the issue in court while maintaining the mascot name.

Notable alumni 
 J.D. Folsom, American football player

References

External links 
 

Educational institutions established in 1980
Public high schools in Idaho
Schools in Lemhi County, Idaho
1980 establishments in Idaho